The 1964 United States presidential election in Florida was held November 3, 1964. All contemporary fifty states and the District of Columbia took part, and Florida voters selected fourteen electors to the Electoral College, who voted for president and vice president.

Background
Like all former Confederate States, Florida following the end of Reconstruction had become a one-party Democratic state as the introduction of poll taxes and literacy tests  effectively disfranchised the entire black population and many poor whites. Unlike southern states extending into the Appalachian Mountains or Ozarks, or Texas with its German settlements in the Edwards Plateau, Florida completely lacked upland or German refugee whites opposed to secession. Thus its Republican Party between 1872 and 1888 was entirely dependent upon black votes, as one can see from the fact that so late as the landmark court case of Smith v. Allwright, half of Florida’s registered Republicans were still black – although very few blacks in Florida had ever voted within the previous fifty-five years. Thus this disfranchisement of blacks and poor whites by a poll tax introduced in 1889 left Florida as devoid of Republican adherents as Louisiana, Mississippi or South Carolina.

Immigration of northerners into the previously undeveloped areas of South Florida, along with fierce anti-Catholicism in the northern Piney Woods, did give Herbert Hoover a freakish victory in 1928, but apart from that the Democratic Party lost only six counties at a presidential level between 1892 and 1944.

Things began to change in the late 1940s, as new migrants from traditionally Republican northern states in Central Florida took their Republican voting habits with them at the presidential level, restricting Harry Truman to under half the statewide vote in 1948 and allowing Dwight D. Eisenhower and Richard Nixon to carry the state in the following three elections. The GOP reached over seventy percent in the retirement areas of the southwest coast, and its success was greatest in areas which had historically not had plantation agriculture and favoured little or no economic regulation. In contrast, North Florida’s Piney Woods had remained loyal to the Democratic Party at all levels despite the 1960 Presidential ticket being headed by another Roman Catholic in John F. Kennedy.

Between the 1960 and 1964 elections, North Florida was severely affected by civil rights protests, especially over school and university integration. Contrariwise, the retirement communities further south that had become powerfully Republican in presidential elections over the previous fifteen years were extremely hostile to GOP nominee Barry Goldwater’s desire to privatize Social Security.

Vote
The two contrasting trends noted previously produced  a major reversal in the voting patterns from the previous four presidential elections: indeed at a county level there was essentially zero correlation between 1960 and 1964 party percentages, and as many as 43% of voters switched parties. Notably, Goldwater's seven strongest counties in this election had all voted Democratic by landslide margins four years prior.

Incumbent President Lyndon Johnson overall won Florida against Goldwater by 42,599 votes, a margin of 2.30%, or a swing of 5.32% from the 1960 result. Increased registration of black voters – it had reached 51% by the time of the election – was crucial to Johnson regaining Florida: in the northern counties of Lafayette and Liberty where no blacks were registered, swings toward Goldwater reached over 100 percentage points. One other factor that was crucial to Johnson's victory was his dominance in populated South Florida, particuraly in Dade County, which Johnson won by over 90,000 votes, more than twice his statewide margin. Excluding Dade County, Goldwater would have won Florida by a margin of 3.2%.

This was the first time ever that Bay County, Franklin County, Gulf County, Lafayette County, Liberty County, Suwannee County, Taylor County, and Wakulla County voted Republican, the first time since 1872 that Jackson County and Columbia County voted Republican, the first time since 1876 that Gadsden County voted Republican, and the first time since 1884 that Leon County, Jefferson County, and Madison County voted Republican.

Florida was the second-closest state won by Johnson, after Idaho. , this is the last election in which the Democratic candidate carried Charlotte County.

This was the only time between 1948 and 1976 that the Democrats carried Florida in a presidential election. However, amidst a national Democratic landslide, Florida weighed in as a massive 20.28% more Republican than the nation at-large, the second most Republican Florida has ever been compared to the nation-at large. Although Johnson carried 20 of the state's 67 counties, in only two of them, Monroe and Dade, did Johnson exceed his nationwide vote share of 61.05%.

Results

Results by county

References 

Florida
1964 Florida elections
1964